Ippolito Aldobrandini (1592 – 19 July 1638) was a Catholic Cardinal. He served as Camerlengo of the Holy Roman Church from 1623 to 1638. Pope Clement VIII, whose birth name was also Ippolito Aldobrandini, was his great-uncle.

References

17th-century Italian cardinals
1592 births
1638 deaths
Camerlengos of the Holy Roman Church